Dunckley (also spelled Dunkley) is an unincorporated community in Routt County, in the U.S. state of Colorado.

History
A post office called Dunkley was established in 1892, and remained in operation until 1943.  The community was named in honor of several members of the local Dunkley family.

References

Unincorporated communities in Routt County, Colorado
Unincorporated communities in Colorado